Villaviciosa, officially the Municipality of Villaviciosa, is a 5th class municipality in the province of Abra, Philippines. According to the 2020 census, it has a population of 5,675 people.

The population was 5,675 at the 2020 census.  The town is known for the Kimkimay Lake, a reminder of the wrath of the gods against people who have numerous vices.

Geography

According to the Philippine Statistics Authority, the municipality has a land area of  constituting  of the  total area of Abra.

The municipality is geographically situated at the southern portion of Abra, bounded in the north-west by San Isidro, north by Bucay, east by Manabo and Luba, south by San Emilio, and west by Pilar.

From the nearby Province of Ilocos Sur, it is also accessible through the Candon via San Emilio to LubaTamac, Villaviciosa Road and the Santa MariaBurgos via PilarVillaviciosa Road.

Climate

Barangays
Villaviciosa is politically subdivided into 8 barangays. These barangays are headed by elected officials: Barangay Captain, Barangay Council, whose members are called Barangay Councilors. All are elected every three years.

Demographics

In the 2020 census, Villaviciosa had a population of 5,675.

Economy

Government
Villaviciosa, belonging to the lone congressional district of the province of Abra, is governed by a mayor designated as its local chief executive and by a municipal council as its legislative body in accordance with the Local Government Code. The mayor, vice mayor, and the councilors are elected directly by the people through an election which is being held every three years.

Elected officials

References

External links

 [ Philippine Standard Geographic Code]
 Municipality of Villaviciosa

Municipalities of Abra (province)